Paul Anthony Cook (born 22 February 1967) is an English professional football manager and former player who is currently manager of  side Chesterfield.

Cook played as a central midfielder during a playing career that spanned 23 years from 1983 until 2006, notably playing in the Premier League for Coventry City. He also played in the Football League for Wigan Athletic, Norwich City, Wolverhampton Wanderers, Tranmere Rovers, Stockport County and Burnley.

Cook moved into management in 2006 with Southport and later moved on to Irish side Sligo Rovers in 2007. In February 2012, he returned to English management with Accrington Stanley before moving to Chesterfield in October 2012. Cook guided Chesterfield to the League Two title in the 2013/14 season. In May 2015, he was appointed manager of League Two outfit Portsmouth after a release clause was met in his Chesterfield contract. Cook led Portsmouth to the League Two title in the 2016/17 season.

In May 2017, he was appointed manager of League One club Wigan Athletic. Cook led Wigan to the League One title and promotion into the Championship. After the club fell into administration, Wigan were subsequently relegated from the Championship in the 2019/20 season following a 12-point deduction. Cook subsequently resigned as Wigan manager in July 2020.

Following his departure from Wigan Athletic, Cook remained unemployed until March 2021 where he was appointed as the manager of Ipswich Town on a contract until 2023. However, Cook was relieved of his duties at Ipswich in early December 2021. Cook returned to Chesterfield as manager in February 2022.

Playing career
Born in Kirkby, Cook began his career in 1983 at local non-league side Marine but made no appearances. In 1984, Cook was signed by Wigan Athletic, where he featured in 83 league games in a four-year spell. Cook then had a brief and unsuccessful spell at Norwich City before moving to the Midlands to sign for Wolverhampton Wanderers for £250,000.

He was a very popular player during his time at Wolves, both with the fans and his teammates and became known for his deadly and accurate left foot. After 193 league appearances for Wolves over five seasons in the second tier, Cook left to sign for Premier League side Coventry City.

Cook played the majority of his games at Coventry in his first season (1994/95) but fell out of favour during the following campaign, where he made only three appearances. In February 1996, Cook was sold to Tranmere Rovers for £250,000.

Whilst at Tranmere, he became a key member of the side, playing 60 league games in just eighteen months. In October 1997, Tranmere accepted a bid of £250,000 from Stockport County and regained the fee initially paid for Cook. After twelve months at County, Cook began to be regarded as 'too old', despite only being 32. This led to Cook making a loan move to Burnley before making the move permanent in July 1999.

After a falling out with Burnley manager Stan Ternent, Cook went on loan to his former club Wigan Athletic, but made just six appearances before he was re-called to again take his place in the starting line up at Turf Moor. Cook left Burnley at the end of the 2002/03 season, alongside teammate Andy Payton. The two players received a standing ovation from the fans for their contributions to the club.

Cook signed for non-league side Accrington Stanley and went on to become a first team regular in their push for promotion to the Football League. This target was finally achieved in the 2005/06 season when Stanley were crowned as Champions of the Conference. After achieving this aim, Cook retired after 643 league appearances for nine different clubs.

After the end of the 2005/06 season, Cook was granted a testimonial by Accrington as a sign of appreciation for his efforts. The testimonial was played on 2 May 2006 at the Interlink Express (now the Wham) Stadium; Accrington against a Burnley Select XI featuring old teammates Dean West, Lenny Johnrose, Ian Cox, Kevin Ball and Cook's son Liam.

Management career

Southport
Cook was appointed manager of Conference side Southport on 13 June 2006, a post he was sacked from in January 2007 following defeat at Northwich Victoria.

Sligo Rovers
On 27 April 2007, Cook was appointed manager of Sligo Rovers taking over from Rob McDonald, who resigned before the start of the season. During Cook's unveiling, he stated that he was from Liverpool and that he will not have anything to do with any journalist from the Irish Sun, (due to the articles printed about Liverpool supporters during the Hillsborough disaster). He led Rovers to a 6th place league finish in his first season in charge. Cook's second season saw him guide the bit o' red to fourth in the league and thus secure a UEFA Cup place.

Cook departed in January 2009 by mutual consent, but soon returned to Sligo a few weeks later after his initial departure.

In his third season, under severe financial constraints, Cook managed a sixth place finish in the league. In addition, Cook guided Rovers to the final of the FAI Cup which took place on 22 November 2009. Cook's Sligo Rovers side lost 2–1 to Sporting Fingal, despite holding a one-goal lead with seven minutes remaining, a huge disappointment for Cook, Rovers and the people of Sligo. 

Cook would soon redeem himself from the cup shortcomings of 2009, with his first piece of silverware as Sligo Rovers manager coming in September 2010, after a 1–0 win over Monaghan United in the final of the League Cup. In November 2010, he brought the FAI Cup back to the north-west, after beating Shams (Shamrock Rovers) on penalties, with Rovers goalkeeper Ciaran Kelly saving all 4 penalties. The 2010 FAI Cup Final was the first major trophy by Cook for Sligo Rovers.  The 2010 League of Ireland season also saw Cook guide Rovers to a 3rd place league finish, securing UEFA Europa League action for the 2011 season. 

In November 2011, Cook won a successive FAI Cup following a 4–1 penalty shootout win against Shelbourne. Cook also guided Sligo to 2nd place in the League of Ireland in his final season in charge.

Accrington Stanley
Following his success in Ireland, Cook was appointed manager of Accrington Stanley on 13 February 2012. He led the team to finish 14th in League Two at the end of the 2011/12 season and continued to manage the side for the opening months of the following campaign.

Chesterfield
On 25 October 2012, Cook joined League Two rivals Chesterfield on a two-and-a-half-year contract, taking over from Tommy Wright, who had been in charge of the Derbyshire club on a caretaker basis following the departure of John Sheridan. The end of his first season saw Cook guide Chesterfield to eighth position finishing just two points outside the play-off zone.

The following season saw Cook guide Chesterfield to the 2013/14 League Two title.

The following campaign saw Chesterfield finish 6th in League One and the play-offs before losing to eventual play-off winners Preston North End.

Portsmouth
On 12 May 2015, Cook was appointed manager of League Two club Portsmouth after Portsmouth met Cook's release clause in his contract at Chesterfield. Cook guided Portsmouth to the League Two title in the 2016/17 season.

Wigan Athletic
On 31 May 2017, Cook was appointed manager of newly relegated League One club Wigan Athletic on a three-year contract, after a compensation package was agreed with Portsmouth. He led Wigan to the League One title and on an impressive FA Cup run that claimed three shocks against top flight opponents West Ham United, AFC Bournemouth and Manchester City. Cook resigned as Wigan manager on 29 July 2020, following the club's relegation from the Championship due to a 12-point deduction after the Latics entered administration.

Ipswich Town
On 2 March 2021, Cook was appointed manager of Ipswich Town on a contract until 2023. Cook's first match in charge was a 3–1 defeat away at Gillingham. His first victory as Ipswich manager came in his third game in charge, a 1–0 home win over Plymouth Argyle. On 7 April 2021, Ipswich Town was taken over by US investment group Gamechanger 20 Limited, with the club confirming that Cook would remain as manager under the new ownership. Ipswich finished 9th in League One at the end of the 2020/21 season.

Ahead of the 2021/22 season, Cook oversaw a major turnover in both the playing squad and coaching staff, backed by the club's new US owners. Over a dozen first team players from the previous season departed with 19 new players joining. The players that departed included longtime club captain Luke Chambers, first team regulars such as Flynn Downes, Andre Dozzell, Gwion Edwards, Alan Judge, Emyr Huws and Teddy Bishop, and 2020/21 player of the season James Wilson. Despite these changes and many tipping the club for promotion, Ipswich made a poor start to the season, taking only two wins in their opening 10 matches. On 4 December 2021, with the team sat in 11th and 7 points adrift of the playoffs, Cook was sacked by the club. Having been in charge for just over 9 months, Cook is the second shortest serving manager in the club's history. Cook argued that he deserved more time in an interview a month after his dismissal, stating "If the new ownership had sat down and said to me at the start that if we didn't have instant success then [I would] be gone, then I wouldn't have stayed. That's my only regret."

Return to Chesterfield
On 10 February 2022, Cook was appointed manager of Chesterfield, returning to the National League club seven years after leaving. 

An impressive start to the 2022–23 saw Chesterfield sitting top of the league at the end of the first month, Cook being awarded the National League Manager of the Month award for his efforts.

Media career
Cook has appeared on RTÉ coverage of League of Ireland matches.

Career statistics

Playing statistics

Source:

Managerial statistics

Honours

Player
Burnley
Football League Second Division runner-up: 1999/2000

Accrington Stanley
Conference National: 2005/06

Individual
Wolverhampton Wanderers Player of the Year: 1992/93

Manager
Sligo Rovers
FAI Cup runner-up: 2009
FAI Cup: 2010, 2011
League of Ireland Cup: 2010

Chesterfield
EFL League Two: 2013/14
Football League Trophy runner-up: 2013/14

Portsmouth
EFL League Two: 2016/17

Wigan Athletic
EFL League One: 2017/18

Individual
EFL League Two Manager of the Month: August 2013, April 2017
LMA League Two Manager of the Year: 2017
EFL League One Manager of the Month: October 2017, March 2018, April 2018
National League Manager of the Month: August 2022

References

External links
Paul Cook profile at the Ipswich Town F.C. website

1967 births
Living people
Footballers from Liverpool
English footballers
Association football midfielders
Marine F.C. players
Wigan Athletic F.C. players
Norwich City F.C. players
Wolverhampton Wanderers F.C. players
Coventry City F.C. players
Tranmere Rovers F.C. players
Stockport County F.C. players
Burnley F.C. players
Accrington Stanley F.C. players
English Football League players
Premier League players
National League (English football) players
English football managers
Southport F.C. managers
Sligo Rovers F.C. managers
Accrington Stanley F.C. managers
Chesterfield F.C. managers
Portsmouth F.C. managers
Wigan Athletic F.C. managers
Ipswich Town F.C. managers
National League (English football) managers
League of Ireland managers
English Football League managers